Rayford Finch (July 12, 1924 – May 20, 1956) was an American Negro league pitcher in the 1940s.

A native of Glascock County, Georgia, Finch played for the Cleveland Buckeyes in 1945. He died in 1956 at age 31.

References

External links
 and Seamheads

1924 births
1956 deaths
Cleveland Buckeyes players
Baseball pitchers
Baseball players from Georgia (U.S. state)
People from Glascock County, Georgia
20th-century African-American sportspeople